Steven Edward Boggs is an American astrophysicist. He is the dean of the division of physical sciences at University of California, San Diego.

Education 
Boggs completed a Ph.D. at University of California, Berkeley (UCB) in 1998.

Career 
Boggs was the chair of the UCB physics department from 2013 to 2016. In 2016, after 16 years on the faculty at UCB, he became the dean of the division of physical sciences at University of California, San Diego (UCSD).

At UCB, Boggs researched supernovas. At UCSD, he develops and flies gamma-ray telescopes for use in space. He measures radioactive nuclei in the inner region of supernova explosions. Boggs studies emissions from gamma rays on the surface of neutron stars by developing sensitive gamma ray instruments including telescopes for satellite and balloon missions.

References

External links 
 

Living people
Year of birth missing (living people)
Place of birth missing (living people)
University of California, Berkeley alumni
University of California, Berkeley College of Letters and Science faculty
American astrophysicists
20th-century American physicists
21st-century American physicists
University of California, San Diego faculty
American university and college faculty deans
20th-century  American astronomers
21st-century  American astronomers